Woman Overboard is an album by English singer Linda Lewis, released in 1977.

Track listing

Side One (Vertical)
 "You Came" – (Allen Toussaint)
 "Shining" – (Allen Toussaint)
 "Bonfire" – (Cat Stevens)
 "Come Back and Finish What You Started" – (Van McCoy, Joe Cobb)
 "No. 1 Heartbreaker" – (Linda Lewis)
 "Dreamer of Dreams" – (Allen Toussaint)

Side Two (Horizontal)
 "Moon and I" – (W.S. Gilbert, Arthur Sullivan; new lyrics: Miller, Rost)
 "Light Years Away" – (Linda Lewis)
 "My Love is Here to Stay" – (Linda Lewis)
 "My Friend the Sun" – (John Whitney, Roger Chapman)
 "So Many Mysteries to Find" – (Linda Lewis)

2011 Remaster Bonus Tracks
 "Never Been Done Before" – (Linda Lewis) – B-side of "Come Back and Finish What You Started"
 "Flipped Over Your Love" – (Linda Lewis) – B-side of "Moon and I"
 "Can't We Just Sit Down and Talk About It" – (Tony Macaulay) – non-album track single

Reception 
Writing for AllMusic, Amy Hanson said: "Although Linda Lewis' April 1977 album Woman Overboard never managed to muscle its way into the U.K. charts, it nevertheless further cemented the singer's place in British pop history with 11 tracks that effortlessly showcased her unique and dynamic vocal range."

Record Mirror described Woman Overboard as "an album of wonderful and varied delights".

Personnel
 Linda Lewis – vocals
 Paul Batiste, Walter Harris, Jim Cregan, Ray Parker Jr., Tim Renwick, Winston Delandro, Jeff Mironov, Jerry Friedman, Lance Quinn – guitar
 Alun Davies – acoustic guitar
 Snowy White – slide guitar
 Clyde Toval, Willie Weeks, Phil Chen, Bob Babbitt – bass
 Allen Toussaint – piano
 James Booker, Jean Roussel, Max Middleton, Derek Austin, Derek Smith – keyboards
 Herman Ernest III, Ollie E. Brown, Richard Bailey – drums
 Kim Joseph, Bobbye Hall, Darryl Lee Que, Jack Jennings, Phil Kraus, Teddy Sommer – percussion
 Carlos Martin – congas
 Steve Gregory – brass
 Peter Hope Evans – harmonica
 Barry St. John, Liza Strike, Vicki Brown, Alex Brown, June D. Williams, Jim Gilstrap, John Perry, Stu Calver, Tony Rivers, Anna Peacock, Bob Barton – background vocals

Production credits
 Allen Toussaint produced tracks 1, 2, 5 and 6 on Side 1
 Jim Cregan produced tracks 1–4 on Side 2 and the first two bonus tracks
 Bert DeCoteaux produced track 5 on Side 2
 Tony Macaulay produced the third bonus track

References 

Linda Lewis albums
1977 albums
Albums produced by Allen Toussaint
Arista Records albums